The 35th Film Independent Spirit Awards, honoring the best independent films of 2019, were presented by Film Independent on February 8, 2020. The nominations were announced on November 21, 2019 by actresses Zazie Beetz and Natasha Lyonne. The ceremony was televised in the United States by IFC, taking place inside its usual tent setting on a beach in Santa Monica, California. Aubrey Plaza returned to host the ceremony for the second time.

Winners and nominees

{| class=wikitable style="width=100%"
|-
!style="width=50%" | Best Feature
!style="width=50%" | Best Director
|-
| valign="top" |
The Farewell
 Clemency
 A Hidden Life
 Marriage Story
 Uncut Gems
| valign="top" |
Josh Safdie and Benny Safdie – Uncut Gems
 Robert Eggers – The Lighthouse
 Alma Har'el – Honey Boy
 Julius Onah – Luce
 Lorene Scafaria – Hustlers
|-
!style="width=50%" | Best Male Lead
!style="width=50%" | Best Female Lead
|-
| valign="top" |
Adam Sandler – Uncut Gems as Howard Ratner
 Chris Galust – Give Me Liberty as Vic
 Kelvin Harrison Jr. – Luce as Luce Edgar
 Robert Pattinson – The Lighthouse as Ephraim Winslow
 Matthias Schoenaerts – The Mustang as Roman Coleman
| valign="top" |
Renée Zellweger – Judy as Judy Garland
 Karen Allen – Colewell as Nora Pancowski
 Hong Chau – Driveways as Kathy
 Elisabeth Moss – Her Smell as Becky Something
 Mary Kay Place – Diane as Diane
 Alfre Woodard – Clemency as Bernadine Williams
|-
!style="width=50%" | Best Supporting Male
!style="width=50%" | Best Supporting Female
|-
| valign="top" |
Willem Dafoe – The Lighthouse as Thomas Wake
 Noah Jupe – Honey Boy as Otis Lort
 Shia LaBeouf – Honey Boy as James Lort
 Jonathan Majors – The Last Black Man in San Francisco as Montgomery "Mont" Allen
 Wendell Pierce – Burning Cane as Reverend Tillman
| valign="top" |
Zhao Shu-zhen – The Farewell as Nai Nai
 Jennifer Lopez – Hustlers as Ramona Vega
 Taylor Russell – Waves as Emily Williams
 Lauren "Lolo" Spencer – Give Me Liberty as Tracy
 Octavia Spencer – Luce as Harriet Wilson
|-
!style="width=50%" | Best Screenplay
!style="width=50%" | Best First Screenplay
|-
| valign="top" |
Noah Baumbach – Marriage Story
 Jason Begue and Shawn Snyder – To Dust
 Ronald Bronstein, Josh Safdie, and Benny Safdie – Uncut Gems
 Chinonye Chukwu – Clemency
 Tarell Alvin McCraney – High Flying Bird
| valign="top" |
Fredrica Bailey and Stefon Bristol – See You Yesterday Hannah Bos and Paul Thureen – Driveways
 Bridget Savage Cole and Danielle Krudy – Blow the Man Down
 Jocelyn DeBoer and Dawn Luebbe – Greener Grass
 James Montague and Craig W. Sanger – The Vast of Night
|-
!style="width=50%" | Best First Feature
!style="width=50%" | Best Documentary Feature
|-
| valign="top" |Olivia Wilde – Booksmart Stefon Bristol – See You Yesterday Michael Angelo Covino – The Climb Laure de Clermont-Tonnerre – The Mustang Kent Jones – Diane Joe Talbot – The Last Black Man in San Francisco| valign="top" |American Factory Apollo 11 For Sama Honeyland Island of the Hungry Ghosts|-
!style="width=50%" | Best Cinematography
!style="width=50%" | Best Editing
|-
| valign="top" |
Jarin Blaschke – The Lighthouse
 Todd Banhazl – Hustlers Natasha Braier – Honey Boy Chananun Chotrungroj – The Third Wife Pawel Pogorzelski – Midsommar| valign="top" |
Ronald Bronstein and Benny Safdie – Uncut Gems
 Julie Béziau – The Third Wife Tyler L. Cook – Sword of Trust Louise Ford – The Lighthouse Kirill Mikhanovsky – Give Me Liberty|-
! colspan="2" style="width=50%" | Best International Film
|-
| colspan="2" valign="top" |Parasite The Invisible Life of Eurídice Gusmão
 Les Misérables
 Portrait of a Lady on Fire
 Retablo
 The Souvenir
|}

Films with multiple nominations and awards

Special awards

John Cassavetes AwardGive Me Liberty Burning Cane Colewell Premature Wild Nights with EmilyRobert Altman Award
(The award is given to its film director, casting director, and ensemble cast)

 Marriage Story – Noah Baumbach, Douglas Aibel, Francine Maisler, Alan Alda, Laura Dern, Adam Driver, Julie Hagerty, Scarlett Johansson, Ray Liotta, Azhy Robertson, and Merritt Wever

Kiehl's Someone to Watch Award
Recognizes a talented filmmaker of singular vision who has not yet received appropriate recognition. The award includes a $25,000 unrestricted grant funded by Kiehl's.

 Rashaad Ernesto Green – Premature
 Ash Mayfair – The Third Wife Joe Talbot – The Last Black Man in San FranciscoThe BONNIE Award
Recognizes mid-career women directors with a body of work that demonstrates uniqueness of vision and a groundbreaking approach to film making. The award includes a $50,000 unrestricted grant funded by American Airlines.

 Kelly Reichardt
 Marielle Heller
 Lulu Wang

Piaget Producers Award
Honors emerging producers who, despite highly limited resources, demonstrate the creativity, tenacity and vision required to produce quality, independent films. The award includes a $25,000 unrestricted grant funded by Piaget.

 Mollye Asher
 Krista Parris
 Ryan Zacarias

Truer than Fiction Award
Presented to an emerging director of non-fiction features who has not yet received significant recognition. The award includes a $25,000 unrestricted grant.

 Nadia Shihab – Jaddoland
 Khalik Allah – Black Mother Davy Rothbart – 17 Blocks Erick Stoll and Chase Whiteside – América''

See also
 92nd Academy Awards
 77th Golden Globe Awards
 73rd British Academy Film Awards
 40th Golden Raspberry Awards
 26th Screen Actors Guild Awards
 25th Critics' Choice Awards

References

External links
 

2019
Independent Spirit Awards
Independent Spirit Awards